This is a list of geographic portmanteaus. Portmanteaus (also called blends) are names constructed by combining elements of two, or occasionally more, other names.

For the most part, the geographic names in this list were derived from two other names or words. Those derived from three or more names are usually considered acronyms or initialisms and can be found in the List of geographic acronyms and initialisms. However, there are exceptions to this two/three rule in both lists, so it is more of a guideline than a hard-and-fast rule.

Note that not all combinations of two names are considered portmanteaus. Simple concatenation of two names (whether hyphenated or not) does not produce a portmanteau. Nor does a combinative form of one name plus the full name of another (examples: Eurasia, Czechoslovakia). These kinds of names are excluded from this list.

Regions named from their components
Some regions (including countries and provinces) have names that are portmanteaus of subregions or cities within the region.

Countries
 Senegambia Confederation — Senegal and The Gambia
 Tanzania — Tanganyika and Zanzibar

Chinese provinces
Some Chinese provinces have names that are blends of their two largest cities.
 Anhui — Anqing and Huizhou (now Huangshan City)
 Fujian — Fuzhou and Jianzhou (now Nanping)
 Gansu — Ganzhou and Suzhou
 Jiangsu — Jiangning (now Nanjing) and Suzhou

Korean provinces
During the Joseon Kingdom, seven Korean provinces (all but the region around the capital) were named by combining the first characters of their two major cities. The provinces were reorganized in the 1890s but the names are still in use. All these traditional provincial names are carried forward by two current provinces and for all except Gangwon (which is the only one where the two carrying the name were split between North and South Korea) a North and a South province of the same name. However note that for most former provinces, the two current provinces with the name are usually not entirely coextensive with the former province.

The dates of the former provinces are those when they carried that name; they often existed with a different name before that year.
 Chungcheong Province — Chungju and Cheongju, former province (1356 to 1895); the name is currently carried by North Chungcheong and South Chungcheong provinces in South Korea
 Gangwon Province (historical) — Gangneung and Wonju, former province (1395 to 1895); name now carried by Gangwon Province, South Korea and Kangwon Province (North Korea)
 Gyeongsang Province — Gyeongju and Sangju, former province (1314–1895); name is currently carried by South Gyeongsang Province and North Gyeongsang Province in South Korea
 Hamgyong Province — Hamhung and Kyongsong, former province (1509–1895); name currently carried by North Hamgyong Province and South Hamgyong Province in North Korea
 Hwanghae Province — Hwangju and Haeju, former province (1395–1895); name carried by North Hwanghae Province and South Hwanghae Province in North Korea
 Jeolla Province — Jeonju and Naju (The first character of Naju is actually "ra"—"r" changes to "n" in the initial position, and the combination "nr" changes to "ll" due to phonological characteristics of the Korean language); now in South Korea
 Pyongan Province — Pyongyang and Anju, former province (1413–1895), now in North Korea

Somalia provinces
Two of Somalia's federal member states are portmanteaus of the smaller administrative regions (gobols) within the states.
 Galmudug — Galguduud and Mudug
 Hirshabelle — Hiran and Middle Shabelle

Vanuatu provinces
Half of Vanuatu's provincial names are portmanteaus of their main islands or island groups. 
 Sanma Province — Espiritu Santo and Malo Island
 Shefa Province — Shepherd Islands and Efate
 Torba Province — Torres Islands and Banks Islands

Merged towns
Sometimes a portmanteau name is created from the names of predecessor towns. Names that are merely a concatenation of the predecessor names, such as Budapest, are excluded.
 Beaverdell, British Columbia — Beaverton and Rendell
 Brockton, Ontario — Brant, Greenock, and Walkerton
 Clarington, Ontario — Clarke and Darlington, two townships
 Rural Municipality of Corman Park No. 344, Saskatchewan — three rural municipalities: Cory No. 344, Warman No. 374 and Park No. 375
 Fairborn, Ohio — Fairfield and Osborn
 Glanbrook, Hamilton, Ontario — Glanford and Binbrook
 Grenola, Kansas — Green Field and Canola
 Kenora, Ontario — Keewatin, Norman, and Rat Portage
 Ramara, Ontario — Rama and Mara Townships
 Sandton, Johannesburg, South Africa — Sandown and Bryanston
 Stonewood, West Virginia — Stonewall and Norwood
 Temvik, North Dakota — Templeton and Larvik

Schools and school districts
Some school districts that serve two or three towns have names that are blends of those towns' names. Or they're a blend of county names that the district covers parts of.
 Chariho Regional School District (Charlestown, Richmond, and Hopkinton), three towns in southwestern Rhode Island who share the district.
 Glenbard Township High School District 87 (Glen Ellyn, Illinois and Lombard, Illinois), two villages who combined to create the district
Kenowa Hills Public Schools (Kent and Ottawa counties), created in 1963 near Grand Rapids, Michigan
 Lin-Wood Public School (Lincoln, New Hampshire and Woodstock, New Hampshire), in Grafton County
 Midpark High School (Middleburg Heights, Ohio and Brook Park, Ohio) former high school whose name survives in Berea–Midpark High School, in Berea, Ohio
 Montabella Community Schools (Montcalm and Isabella counties), created in 1966 in Michigan
 Nordonia Hills City School District (Northfield (Village and Center), Macedonia and Sagamore Hills) in Summit County, Ohio
 Schalmont Central School District (Schenectady, Albany, and Montgomery Counties in New York), covers parts of all three counties
 Woodmore Local School District (Woodville, Ohio and Elmore, Ohio) in Sandusky and Ottawa Counties

Other regions portmanteaued from their components
 Afrabia — Africa and Arabia
 Benelux — Belgium, Netherlands, Luxembourg
 Chambana, Illinois — Champaign and Urbana, Illinois
 Chindia — China and India
 Eurabia — Europe and Arabia
 Rural Municipality of Kellross No. 247, Saskatchewan — Kelliher and Leross, two villages within the municipality
 Lamorinda — a region of Contra Costa County, California comprising Lafayette, Moraga, and Orinda
 Rural Municipality of Mayfield No. 406, Saskatchewan — Maymont and Fielding, two communities within the municipality
 Sauk Prairie, Wisconsin — Sauk City and Prairie du Sac
 Talsinki — Tallinn, Estonia and Helsinki, Finland, informal region around these two capitals, especially in regards to the proposed tunnel between them
 Valguedas — Valtierra and Arguedas, informal name for the area of two Navarrese villages

Border portmanteaus
A border portmanteau combines the names of two, or occasionally three, adjacent polities (countries, states, provinces, counties, cities) to form a name for a region, town, body of water, or other feature on or near their mutual border.

Regions

Generalized border regions
These are generalized (and unofficial) regions usually centered on cities near state borders in the United States. They usually extend across state lines and their names are portmanteaus of two or three state names.
 Arklahoma (Arkansas and Oklahoma) region centered around Fort Smith, Arkansas
 Arklamiss (Arkansas, Louisiana, and Mississippi) region near Monroe, Louisiana
 Ark-La-Tex (Arkansas, Louisiana, and Texas) a U.S. socio-economic region where Arkansas, Louisiana, Texas, and Oklahoma intersect; urban center is Shreveport, Louisiana
 Cal-Neva (California and Nevada) centered in the Sierra Nevada mountains west of Reno, Nevada
 Florgia (Florida and Georgia) centered on Jacksonville, Florida
 Georgialina (Georgia and South Carolina) a term for the Central Savannah River Area (CSRA) of Augusta, Georgia and its surrounding areas 
 Illiana (Illinois and Indiana) centered on Danville, Illinois
 Illowa (Illinois and Iowa) region centered around the Quad Cities area
 Kentuckiana (Kentucky and Indiana) a popular local name for the Louisville-Jefferson County, KY-IN Metropolitan Statistical Area, centered on Louisville, Kentucky and spreading across the Ohio River into Indiana
 Michiana (Michigan and Indiana) region whose main urban center is South Bend, Indiana
 Minnesconsin (Minnesota and Wisconsin) area of northwestern Wisconsin near the Minneapolis–Saint Paul metropolitan area (unlike the others, this region does not extend across the state line)
 Texhoma (Texas and Oklahoma) centered on Wichita Falls, Texas and not necessarily distinct from Texoma
 Texoma (Texas and Oklahoma) region surrounding Lake Texoma

Other portmanteau regions
 Delmarva Peninsula (Delaware, Maryland, and Virginia) a large peninsula on the East Coast of the United States, occupied by Delaware and portions of Maryland and Virginia
 Kennessee (Kentucky and Tennessee) a formerly disputed strip of land along the Kentucky-Tennessee border

Towns, villages, and localities
§ This symbol marks localities with no current population; some of them never had any population.

Blends of country, state, and province names
Note: places listed on the same line are immediately across the border from each other. Some others with non-similar names are also across a border from each other.
§ Alaflora, Alabama (Alabama and Florida) former logging town in Escambia County
§ Alaga, Alabama (Alabama and Georgia) town and shipping point where the Alabama Midland Railway crossed the Chattahoochee River
 Alcan Border, Alaska (Alaska and Canada) port of entry where the Alaska Highway (formerly the Alcan Highway) crosses into Alaska
 Alsask, Saskatchewan (Alberta and Saskatchewan)
 Arkana, Louisiana and Arkana, Arkansas (Arkansas and Louisiana) town of some 500 people with post office (1890–1931) in Lafayette County, Arkansas and Bossier Parish, Louisiana; now reduced to a single tavern on the Louisiana side of the border,
 Arkinda, Arkansas (Arkansas and Indian Territory, now Oklahoma) former trading post with the Choctaw Nation just across the Indian Territory line
§ Arkla, Arkansas (Arkansas and Louisiana), former railroad stop in Chicot County
§ Arkmo, Missouri (Arkansas and Missouri) likely former stop on the Kennett & Osceola Railroad in Dunklin County
 Arkoma, Oklahoma (Arkansas and Oklahoma)
 Armorel, Arkansas (Arkansas, Missouri, and initials of Robert E. Lee Wilson)
§ Artex, Arkansas (Arkansas and Texas) locality and former post office about 10 miles (16 kilometers) east of Texarkana
 Calexico, California (California and Mexico)
 Calexico Lodge, California (California and Mexico) place in San Diego County near Boulevard, California
§ Calneva, California (California and Nevada) former town near Calneva Lake, east of Honey Lake
 Cal-Nev-Ari, Nevada (California, Nevada, and Arizona)
§ Calor, California (California and Oregon) former railroad stop in Siskiyou County, some 8 miles (13 kilometers) east of Dorris, California
§ Calor, Oregon (California and Oregon) former railroad stop on Southern Pacific's Cascade Line
§ Calvada, California (California and Nevada) former stop on the Central Pacific Railroad
 Calvada Springs, California (California and Nevada), now known as Charleston View
§ Calzona, California (California and Arizona) former town with a post office (1909–14) and rail depot (1909–17) on the Arizona and California Railway; site now west of Big River, California
§ Carotenn, North Carolina (North Carolina and Tennessee) another name for Lost Cove, North Carolina, a former logging town and moonshining locale, now a ghost town
 Carova Beach, North Carolina (North Carolina and Virginia)
§ Cokan, Kansas (Colorado and Kansas), community located about 2 miles (3 kilometers) east of the Colorado-Kansas line in Greeley County from the 1930s to the 1950s
§ Colmex, Colorado (Colorado and New Mexico) former Denver and Rio Grande Railroad stop in La Plata County
§ Colokan, Kansas (Colorado and Kansas) a short-lived (1887–1897) town half a mile east of the Colorado-Kansas border in Greeley County
§ Dakomin, Minnesota (South Dakota and Minnesota) former town on Lake Traverse
 Delmar, Delaware and Delmar, Maryland (Delaware and Maryland)
 Flomaton, Alabama (Florida, Alabama, plus -ton)
 Florala, Alabama (Florida and Alabama)
§ Idmon, Idaho (Idaho and Montana) former town in the Camas Meadows area of Clark County
§ Illiana, Illinois (Edgar County) (Illinois and Indiana) former name of Raven, Illinois
 Illiana, Illinois (Vermilion County) (Illinois and Indiana)
 Illiana Heights, Illinois (Illinois and Indiana)
 Illmo, Scott City, Missouri (Illinois and Missouri) railroad town located at the Missouri end of a rail bridge over the Mississippi River; now merged with Scott City
§ Kanado, Kansas (Kansas and Colorado), community located about 10 miles (16 kilometers) east of Colorado-Kansas line in Greeley County during the 1940s
 Kanorado, Kansas (Kansas and Colorado) town in the middle of sunflower fields that has seen busier days
 Kenova, West Virginia (Kentucky, Ohio, and West Virginia)
 Kensee, Kentucky (Kentucky and Tennessee), former coal mining town in Whitley County near Jellico, Tennessee
 Kentenia, Kentucky (Kentucky, Tennessee, and Virginia) former coal mining town in Harlan County near the southeastern point of Kentucky
 Kenvir, Kentucky (Kentucky and Virginia) former coal mining town whose mineworkers engaged in the Coal Wars in Harlan County, including the Battle of Evarts
§ Laark, Louisiana (Louisiana and Arkansas), former shipping and supply point in northeastern Morehouse Parish; now a rural locality
§ Latex, Louisiana and Latex, Texas (Louisiana and Texas) former town on the border, in both Caddo Parish, Louisiana and Harrison County, Texas
 Latex, Texas (Panola County) (Louisiana and Texas) former name of Panola, Texas
 Mardela Springs, Maryland (Maryland and Delaware)
 Marydel, Delaware and Marydel, Maryland (Maryland and Delaware)
§ Mexhoma, Oklahoma (New Mexico and Oklahoma)town along the Cimarron Route of the Santa Fe Trail; now no longer inhabited
 Mexicali, Baja California (Mexico and California)
 Michiana, Michigan and Michiana Shores, Indiana (Michigan and Indiana)
§ Missala, Alabama (Mississippi and Alabama) former post office (1916–1925) serving a short-lived logging boom in Choctaw County
 Moark, Arkansas (Missouri and Arkansas) town formed when the railroad came in the 1870s and went away when the rail did in the 1960s
§ Moark, Missouri (Missouri and Arkansas) former shipping point for the Missouri-Arkansas Lumber Company
§ Mokan, Missouri (Missouri and Kansas) former coal-shipping town in Bates County
§ Mondak, Montana and East Mondak, North Dakota (Montana and North Dakota) Wild West town providing liquor, gambling, and other adult recreations during a period when North Dakota prohibited alcohol and Montana did not; losing its raison d'etre with Prohibition, the town was abandoned and then destroyed by wildfire in the 1920s,
 Monida, Montana (Montana and Idaho) former rail service town where the Utah and Northern Railroad crossed the Continental Divide at Monida Pass
§ Monota, Montana (Montana and North Dakota) village with post office in the early 20th century
 Nocarva, North Carolina (North Carolina and Virginia) community of lakeside homes with private airstrip on the shore of Lake Gaston
 North Kenova, Ohio (Kentucky, Ohio, (West) Virginia)
§ Nosodak, North Dakota (North and South Dakota) platted, but never actually settled; town site now within Lake Oahe
§ Nypenn, New York (New York and Pennsylvania) former station on the New York, Chicago, and St. Louis Railroad south of State Line in Chautauqua County
§ Oklarado, Colorado (Oklahoma and Colorado) former farming community in Baca County
§ Orcal, Oregon (Oregon and California) former railroad stop on the Southern Pacific's Siskiyou Line
§ Otex, Oklahoma (Harmon County) (Oklahoma and Texas)
§ Otex, Oklahoma (Texas County) (Oklahoma and Texas) former post office just northeast of Texhoma
 Pen Mar, Maryland and Pen Mar, Pennsylvania (Pennsylvania and Maryland)
 Penowa, Pennsylvania (Pennsylvania, Ohio, and West Virginia) small residential community, formerly a coal mining town, in Washington County
 Saskalta, Alberta (Saskatchewan and Alberta), former name of Altario
 Sylmar, Maryland and Sylmar, Pennsylvania (Pennsylvania and Maryland) former town with rail station straddling the state border near US Highway 1, now a rural area
§ Tenark, Arkansas (Tennessee and Arkansas) Union Pacific Railroad stop southwest of West Memphis, Arkansas
§ Tennelina, North Carolina (Tennessee and North Carolina) former post office on Shut-in Creek in Madison County
§ Tennemo, Tennessee (Tennessee and Missouri) former lumber town (saw mill and shipping point) on the Mississippi River in Dyer County
 Tennga, Georgia (Tennessee and Georgia)
 Texarkana, Texas and Texarkana, Arkansas (Texas, Arkansas, and Louisiana)
 Texhoma, Oklahoma and Texhoma, Texas (Texas and Oklahoma)
 Texico, New Mexico (Texas and New Mexico)
 Texla, Texas (Texas and Louisiana) former logging town with post office (1905–1929) in Orange County
 Texola, Oklahoma (Texas and Oklahoma), previously known as Texoma and Texokla
§ Ucolo, Utah (Utah and Colorado)
§ Urado, Utah (Utah and Colorado) former post office and school in San Juan County
§ Utida, Utah (Utah and Idaho) former railroad town (including maintenance shop) on the Utah Northern Railroad (now Union Pacific Railroad) in Cache County
 Uvada, Nevada (Utah and Nevada) ranching community in White Pine County
§ Uvada, Utah (Utah and Nevada) former rail station and siding in Iron County
 Vershire, Vermont (Vermont and New Hampshire)
 Virgilina, Virginia (Virginia and North Carolina)
 Vir-Mar Beach, Virginia (Virginia and Maryland) riverside community near the confluence of the Patomac with Chesapeake Bay
 Wyocolo, Wyoming (Wyoming and Colorado)
§ Wyuta, Utah (Wyoming and Utah) former station on the Union Pacific Railroad in either Rich or Summit Counties

Blends of county names
 Banida, Idaho (Bannock and Oneida Counties)
 Calion, Arkansas (Calhoun and Union Counties)
 Colmor, New Mexico (Colfax and Mora Counties)
 Dalark, Arkansas (Dallas and Clark Counties)
 Dalhart, Texas (Dallam and Hartley Counties)
 Dalrock, Texas (Dallas and Rockwall Counties) neighbourhood of Rowlett, Texas near and along Dalrock Road
 Flomot, Texas (Floyd and Motley Counties)
 Kiogree, Oklahoma (Kiowa and Greer Counties)
 Harbell, Kentucky (Harlan and Bell Counties)
 Inyokern, California (Kern and Inyo Counties)
 Linchester, Maryland (Caroline and Dorchester Counties)
 Manasota, Florida and Manasota Key, Florida (Manatee and Sarasota Counties)
 Norcatur, Kansas (Norton and Decatur Counties)
 Wamac, Illinois (Washington, Marion, and Clinton Counties)
 Yampo, Oregon (Yamhill and Polk Counties)
 Yolano, California (Yolo and Solano Counties)

Blends of town names
 Arlmont Village (Arlington and Belmont), neighbourhood of Arlington, Massachusetts
 Bel-Red (Bellevue, Washington and Redmond, Washington) a neighbourhood of Bellevue adjacent to Redmond
 Burnaugh, Kentucky (Burgess Station and Kavanaugh)
 Dalworthington Gardens, Texas (Dallas, Fort Worth, and Arlington)
 Deltona, Florida, (DeLand and Daytona)
 Ellport, Pennsylvania (Ellwood City and Portersville)
 Gerled, Iowa (German and Ledyard Townships)
 Glendale Heights, Illinois (Glen Ellyn and Bloomingdale)
 Hadlyme, Connecticut (Haddam and Lyme, adjacent towns)
 Harwinton, Connecticut (Hartford, Windsor, and Farmington)
 Kreuzkölln, Berlin (Kreuzberg and Neukölln) unofficial name of a gentrified area composed of northern Neukölln and southern Kreuzberg, two boroughs of Berlin, Germany
 Linworth, Ohio (Dublin and Worthington)
 Marven Gardens, Margate City, New Jersey (Margate City and Ventnor City), neighbourhood that the Monopoly location Marvin Gardens was named after.
 Mayro Park, Gauteng, South Africa (Mayberry Park and Alrode, two suburbs of Alberton, Gauteng)
 Milmay, New Jersey (Millville and Mays Landing)
 Mindale, Illinois (Minier, Illinois and Hopedale, Illinois), community in Tazewell County
 Norridge, Illinois (Norwood Park Township and Park Ridge)
 Norview (Norfolk, Virginia and Ocean View (Norfolk)), neighbourhood of Norfolk, Virginia
 Sanlando Springs, Florida (Sanford, Florida and Orlando, Florida)
 SeaTac, Washington (Seattle and Tacoma)
 Vade, Saskatchewan  (Vanscoy and Delisle), rail siding at potash mine between the two towns
 Vanport City, Oregon (Portland, Oregon and Vancouver, Washington), a town on the Portland side of the Columbia river, no longer in existence.
 Ventucopa, California (Ventura and Maricopa)
 Warranwood, Victoria (Warrandyte South and Ringwood) suburbs of Melbourne
 Willowick, Ohio (Willoughby and Wickliffe) suburbs of Cleveland

Bodies of water
Lakes that are on or near borders also sometimes get named with portmanteaus of the neighbouring polities.
 Alsask Lake(Alberta and Saskatchewan) near Alsask, Saskatchewan
 Arkla Lake (Arkansas and Louisiana) Miller County, Arkansas
 Calneva Lake (California and Nevada) Lassen County, California
 Lake Keomah — a man-made lake 4 miles (6 kilometers) east of Oskaloosa, Iowa named for the two counties that financed it, Keokuk and Mahaska
 Lake Koocanusa — a reservoir named for the river it dams (Kootenay River) and the countries whose border it straddles (Canada and United States) located in British Columbia and Montana
 Mansask Lake (Manitoba and Saskatchewan) near Saskman Lake
 Mantario Lake (Manitoba and Ontario)
 Mantricia Lake (Manitoba and Patricia District, part of Kenora District, Ontario)
 Lake Michiana (Michigan and Indiana) Branch County, Michigan and Steuben County, Indiana
 Sangchris Lake (Sangamon and Christian Counties) reservoir southeast of Springfield, Illinois
 Saskman Lake (Saskatchewan and Manitoba) near Mansask Lake
 Saskoba Lake (Saskatchewan and Manitoba)
 Lake Talquin — Tallahassee and Quincy, Florida
 Texarkana Reservoir (Texas, Arkansas, and Louisiana) original name of reservoir on the Sulphur River in Texas, renamed Lake Texarkana, now known as Wright Patman Lake
 Lake Texoma — a man-made lake on the Red River that divides Texas and Oklahoma
 Uvada Reservoir (Utah and Nevada) Lincoln County, Nevada
 Lake Wissota (Wisconsin and Minnesota) a large reservoir in Chippewa Falls, Wisconsin

Topography
Geographic features on borders or between towns sometimes get border portmanteau names.
 Canalaska Mountain, (Canada and Alaska)
 Canida Peak (Canada and Idaho)
 Chiwaukee Prairie (Chicago and Milwaukee) large prairie in southeast Wisconsin preserved as a wildlife area
 Huatung Valley — from Hualien City to Taitung City in eastern Taiwan
 Monida Pass (Montana and Idaho)

Roads and other forms of transportation
These can either run along or near a border or connect two places.

Roads along a border
 Beltagh Avenue (North Bellmore, New York and Wantagh, New York) part runs along the boundary between the hamlets of North Bellmore and Wantagh, the rest along the boundary between Bellmore and North Bellmore
 Can-Ada Road (Canyon County, Idaho and Ada County, Idaho) along two different sections of the county line, one known as North Can-Ada Road and the other as South Can-Ada Road.
 Canusa Street (Canada and United States) runs along the border between Beebe Plain, Vermont and Standstead, Quebec
 Clarabella Road (Clare County, Michigan and Isabella County, Michigan), on the county line near the city of Clare
 Clareola Avenue (Clare County, Michigan and Osceola County, Michigan) road on county line
 Claroskee Road (Clare County, Michigan, Roscommon County, Michigan, and Missaukee County, Michigan), road along northern border of Clare County and southern border of Missaukee and Roscommon Counties
 Clarwin Road, Clarwin Avenue (Clare County Michigan and Gladwin County, Michigan) road along county line, with different parts known as Road and Avenue
 Clintonia Road (Clinton County, Michigan and Ionia County, Michigan) western border of Clinton County, eastern border of Ionia County
 Costabella Avenue (Mecosta County, Michigan and Isabella County, Michigan), on the county line
 Dalrock Road (Dallas County, Texas and Rockwall County, Texas) on the county line within the city of Rowlett, Texas
 Fitchrona Road (Fitchburg, Wisconsin and Verona (town), Wisconsin) road on the town line between two Dane County communities
Grand-Kal Road (Grand Traverse County, Michigan and Kalkaska County, Michigan), on the county line near the village of Fife Lake
 Kenowa Avenue (Kent County, Michigan and Ottawa County, Michigan) western border of Kent, eastern border of Ottawa
 Meceola Road (Mecosta County, Michigan and Osceola County, Michigan), road along the border of two counties.
 Michiana Drive (Michigan and Indiana) street on the mutual city limits of Michiana, Michigan and Michiana Shores, Indiana, which also puts it on the state border between Michigan and Indiana
 Millfair Road (Millcreek Township and Fairview Township) road along the border of two townships in Erie County, Pennsylvania
 Newcosta Avenue (Newaygo County, Michigan and Mecosta County, Michigan), road along the county line
 Ottagan Street (Ottawa County, Michigan and Allegan County, Michigan) southern border of Ottawa, northern border of Allegan
 Stainash Crescent (Staines-upon-Thames and Ashford, Surrey), east of Staines, west of Ashford

Connectors
 Alcan Highway (Alaska and Canada) also known as the Alaska Highway
 Bakerloo line (Baker Street and Waterloo) London Underground line originally just connecting the Waterloo tube station with the Baker Street tube station, although now it goes much further
 Bel-red Road (Bellevue, Washington and Redmond, Washington) the main street of Bel-Red, Bellevue connecting two Seattle suburbs
 Floribraska Avenue, Tampa, Florida (Florida Avenue and Nebraska Avenue) connects North Florida Avenue on the west with Nebraska Avenue on the east, passing under Interstate-275 and crossing several other streets
 Hurontario Street (Lake Huron and Lake Ontario) from Mississagua, Ontario on Lake Ontario to Collingwood, Ontario on Lake Huron
 Ken Tenn Highway (Kentucky and Tennessee) Tennessee State Route 214, a road between Fulton, Kentucky/South Fulton, Tennessee and Union City, Tennessee
 Melqua Road (Melrose, Oregon and Umpqua, Oregon) road between two small Oregon communities
 Tamiami Trail (Tampa and Miami) highway connecting two Florida cities
 Tenn-Tom (Tennessee River and Tombigbee River) popular name for the Tennessee–Tombigbee Waterway

Other border portmanteaus
 Frelard (Fremont, Seattle and Ballard, Seattle) an unofficial neighbourhood where two other neighbourhoods meet
 Mantario Trail (Manitoba and Ontario) hiking trail mostly in Manitoba but partially in Ontario
 Mari-Osa State Wildlife Area, Missouri (Maries and Osage Counties)
 Minn-Kota State Wildlife Management Area, Minnesota (Minnesota and South Dakota)

Maps
Below are maps of the towns (red dots), bodies of water (blue dots), and other geographic features (green dots) that are portmanteaus of country, state, and province names. Also included are pseudo-border portmanteau towns (yellow dots).

Map legend:
 red dot    = border portmanteau towns and localities
 yellow dot = pseudo-border portmanteaus
 blue dot   = bodies of water
 green dot  = other features

Pseudo-border portmanteaus
Some places have names that are blends of country, state, and provincial names. However, they are either not near their mutual border, or of regions that do not have a mutual border.
 Altario, Alberta (Alberta and Ontario), formerly Saskalta (Saskatchewan and Alberta)
 Altorado, Alberta (Alberta and Colorado), named by Mormon settlers from Colorado
 Arizmo, Arizona (Arizona and Missouri), settled by people from Missouri
 Arkana, Arkansas (Baxter County) (Arkansas and Louisiana)
 Cal-Ida, California (California and Idaho)
 Delmar Boulevard (Delaware and Maryland), major street in St. Louis, Missouri; named by two early landowners along the street, one from Delaware and one from Maryland
 Delmar Township, Pennsylvania (Delaware and Maryland), originally Virdelmar (Virginia, Delaware and Maryland)
 Flomich, Florida (Florida and Michigan), founder being a native of Michigan
 Floribec, Florida (Florida and Quebec), area of Florida very popular with Québécois vacationers and increasingly all-year residents
 § Kaneb, Nebraska (Kansas and Nebraska), BNSF Railway stop in Fillmore County
 Kyana, Indiana (Kentucky and Indiana)
 § Kymo, Arizona (Kentucky and Missouri), first settlers were two families, one from each state
 Lake Wissota, Wisconsin (Wisconsin and Minnesota), town on the lake, also known as Lake Wissota Village
 Mankota, Saskatchewan (Manitoba and North Dakota), original homes of the settlers
 Mantario, Saskatchewan (Manitoba and Ontario), named after two provinces in imitation of nearby Alsask
 Michillinda Lodge, Michigan (Michigan, Illinois, and Indiana)
 Ohiowa, Nebraska (Ohio and Iowa), settled by people from both states.
 Ovapa, West Virginia (Ohio, Virginia, Pennsylvania)
 Sasman No. 336, Saskatchewan (Saskatchewan and Manitoba), Regional Municipality, the equivalent of a county
 Tennala, Alabama (Tennessee and Alabama)
 Texhoma City, Texas (Texas and Oklahoma) oil boom town in Archer County during the 1920s; gradually disappeared after the oil was gone
 Texla, Texas (Houston County) (Texas and Louisiana) not near Houston, but also not near the Louisiana border
 Texmo, Oklahoma (Texas and Missouri) settlers from Missouri
 Ukalta, Alberta (Ukraine and Alberta)
 § Viropa, West Virginia (Virginia, Ohio, Pennsylvania)
 Wyodak, Wyoming (Wyoming and South Dakota)

From personal names
Most here are blends of two personal names, but some are of a personal name with some other name or word.
 Adsul, Texas — Adams and Sullivan, sawmill owners
 Albertha, North Dakota — Allen Town and Bertha Dickie
 Alikanna, Ohio — Alexander and Anna Beatty, town founders
 Allock, Kentucky — J. B. Allen and H. E. Bullock, mine owners
 Almena, Wisconsin — Albert and Wilhelmena Koehler, early settlers
 Alpat Lake (body of water in Saskatchewan) — Al Billwiller and Pat Gillis, prospectors
 Andale, Kansas — Anderson and Dale, early settlers
 Anjean, West Virginia — Ann and Jean, mother and daughter, respectively, of mine owner, Mr Leckie
 Annabella, Utah — Ann S. Roberts and Isabella Dalton, early settlers
 Annada, Missouri — Ann and Ada Jamison, daughters of Carson Jamison, early settler
 Annelly, Kansas — Ann and Ellie, wife and daughter of a railroad official
 Annfred, West Virginia — Anna and Fred, railway official and wife
 Annis, Idaho — Ann Kearney (first postmistress) and the word "island"
 Arizola, Arizona — Arizona and Ola Thomas, daughter of an early settler
 Artanna, Ohio — Arthur "Art" and Anna Wolfe, store owners
 Arthyde, Minnesota — Arthur and Clyde Hutchins, town founders
 Atolia, California — Atkins and DeGolia, mining company officials
 Austwell, Texas — Preston R. Austin and Jesse C. McDowell, founders
 Berclair, Texas — Bert and Clair Lucas, local ranchers
 Birkbeck, Illinois — two railroad officials: Birk and Beck
 Birome, Texas — Bickham and Jerome Cartwright, brothers, ranchers, landowners
 Broad Park, Indiana — J. C. Broadstreet and Hugh Parker, local landowners
 Brookneal, Virginia — John Brooke and Sarah Neal Brooke, husband and wife, owners of a tobacco warehouse
 Brownfield, Illinois — two prominent local citizens: John Brown and Lewis Field
 Carson, North Dakota — early businessmen: Frank Carter and David and Simon Pederson
 Churchill, Idaho — Church and Hill were common family names among the early settlers
 Clemscott, Oklahoma — Clem Brooks and Scott Sparks
 Coeburn, Virginia — W. W. Coe, Chief Engineer of the N&W RR and Judge W. E. Burns
 Cokesbury, Maryland — Thomas Coke and Francis Asbury, dead bishops
 Colver, Pennsylvania — Coleman and Weaver, mine owners
 Como, Missouri — Covey and Moberley, founders (note: not Como, Missouri in New Madrid County)
 Cookson, Saskatchewan — Jack Cook and Albert Hodgson, homesteaders
 Cootehill, County Cavan, Ireland — Thomas Coote and Frances Hill, husband and wife (early name dating from the 17th century)
 Coppereid, Nevada — "copper" and John T. Reid, prospector
 Coxby, Saskatchewan — George Cox and Grandby, Quebec, homesteader and former home
 Craneco, West Virginia — Cole and Crane, a Cincinnati lumber company
 Cresbard, South Dakota — John A. Cressey and Fred Baird, early settlers
 Cuyuna Range, Minnesota – Cuyler Adams and his dog Una, prospectors 
 Cynthiana, Kentucky — Cynthia and Anna Harrison, daughters of Robert Harrison, land donor
 Dalkena, Washington — Dalton and Kennedy, mill owners
 Dankin, Saskatchewan — Bob Daniels and Bill King, early settlers
 Davella, Kentucky — postmaster Dave Delong and wife Ella
 Dayhoit, Kentucky — Day (family name and original town name) plus Roy Wilhoit (mine owner)
 Declo, Idaho — Dethles and Cloughly, family names of early settlers
 Denmar, West Virginia — Dennison and Maryland, early settler and his state of origin
 Dewmaine, Illinois — George Dewey, U.S. admiral in the Spanish–American War, and the USS Maine, ship whose destruction precipitated that war
 Donora, Pennsylvania — William Donner and Nora Mellon, wife of banker Andrew W. Mellon
 Dorintosh, Saskatchewan — Dorise Nielsen and Cameron Ross McIntosh, successive Members of Parliament for North Battleford
 Dunbar, Kentucky — Dunn and Barrow, two local family names
 Dunbridge, Ohio — Dunn and Trowbridge, early settlers
 Dunrea, Manitoba — Adam Dunlop, postmaster and Thomas Rea, farmer
 Rural Municipality of Eldon No. 471, Saskatchewan — Alexander Elliott and John Albert Gordon, early homesteaders
 Elmonica, Oregon — Eleanor and Monica Stoy, daughters of Sam B. Stoy, early resident and landowner
 Elwin, Illinois — Elwood and Martin, town founders
 Elyria, Ohio — Heman Ely and wife Maria
 Emmalena, Kentucky — Emma Thurman, wife of the petitioner for the post office, and Orlena Combs Morgan, first postmistress
 Emington, Illinois — Emma Marvin, wife of founder William Marvin, and Livingston County
 Faywood, New Mexico — J. C. Fay and William Lockwood, two of three developers
 Felda, Florida — Felix and Ida Taylor, husband and wife
 Floydada, Texas — Floyd County and Ada Price, mother of T. W. Price, local rancher
 Fluvanna County, Virginia — fluvius (Latin, "river") and Anne, Queen of Great Britain
 Frenchglen, Oregon — Peter French and Dr Hugh James Glenn, ranchers
 Geraldton, Ontario — Fitzgerald and Joseph Errington, mine financiers
 Gilsum, New Hampshire — Samuel Gilbert and his son-in-law, Thomas Sumner
 Gladmar, Saskatchewan — Gladstone and Margaret Black, children of first postmaster
 Gladstell, Texas — Gladys and Estell Grogan, the daughters of George and Will Grogan, sawmill owners
 Glenada, Oregon — "glen" plus Ada, for Jane Ada Colter and Ada Colter, wife and daughter of George Colter, town founder
 Glenbain, Saskatchewan — Richard Bruce McBain, JP and Glengarry County, Ontario, his former home
 Gracemont, Oklahoma — Grace and Montgomery, two friends of the first postmaster
 Gragreen, North Dakota —A. H. Gray and D. W. Green, early pioneers
 Grano, North Dakota — either Charles Grace and Lano Robert Ortberg, newspapermen from Mohall ND, or A. D. Greene, railroad official, and Charles Lano, postmaster at Mohall (or possibly from Grain-0 cereal)
 Greenspond, Newfoundland and Labrador — first two families: Green and Pond (very old name dating from the early 1700s)
 Hanfield, Indiana — Hancock and Garfield
 Hargill, Texas — William Apsey Harding and Samuel Lamar Gill, town developers
 Haysi, Virginia — Charles M. Hayter and Otis L. Sifers, store owners
 Hernshaw, West Virginia — Robert Herndon and partner Renshaw, coal mine owners
 Hughton, Saskatchewan — Hugh and Milton Winters, sons of O. O. Winters, first village overseer
 Idabel, Oklahoma — Ida and Belle Purnell, daughters of Isaac Purnell, railroad official
 Idalou, Texas — either Lou and Ida Bacon, early settlers, or Ida and Lou Bassett, daughters of Julian M. Bassett, rancher
 Idana, Kansas — Ida Howland and Anna Broughton, early settlers
 Iraan, Texas — Ira and Ann Yates, local ranchers
 Isaban, West Virginia — Isabel and Ann, persons unknown
 Ismay, Montana — Isabella and May, daughters of a railroad official
 Jan Phyl Village, Florida —  Janet and Phyllis, daughters of the founder, Henry Lesnik
 Jerico Springs, Missouri — Jericho (ancient city) and Joseph B. Carrico, settler
 Joetta, Illinois — Joel and Marietta Booz, son-in-law and daughter of James Martin, first postmaster
 Jonancy, Kentucky — Joe Hudson and Nancy Ratliffe, employees (bookkeeper and timekeeper, respectively) of the local coal mining company (Kentucky Block Fuel Company)
 Juliaetta, Idaho — Julia and Etta, daughters of Charles Snyder, the first postmaster
 Kenbridge, Virginia — Kennedy and Bridgeforth, landowners' names
 Keymar, Maryland — Key, family name (Francis Scott Key was a member) and Maryland
 Kildav, Kentucky — Killebrew and Davis, mine owners
 Kormak, Ontario — Charles Korpela and Oscar Maki, lumbermen
 Krydor, Saskatchewan — Peter Krysak and Teodor Lucyk, prominent settlers
 LaBelle, Florida — Laura June and Carrie Belle, daughters of Francis Asbury Hendry, politician and rancher
 Langruth, Manitoba — Langdon and Ruth, landowners
 Lewanna, Nebraska — Lewellen, last name of first postmaster plus Anna, his daughter
 Lanton, Missouri — Lancaster and Sutton, early settlers
 Lawtell, Louisiana — Lawler and Littell, town founders
 Lazbuddie, Texas — D. Luther "Laz" Green and Andrew "Buddie" Sherley, store owners
 Leaday, Texas — J. C. Lea and Mabel Doss Day, ranch owners
 Lillybrook, West Virginia — Lilly and Hornbrook, mine owners
 Lisabeula, Washington — Elisa and Beulah Butts, daughters of the first postmaster
 Livermore, Colorado — Adophus Livernash and Stephen Moore, early settlers
 Mabank, Texas — G. W. Mason and Thomas Eubank, town founders, ranchers
 Macworth, Saskatchewan — McEwen and Elsworth, local families
 Mansfield, Texas — Ralph S. Man and Julian Feild[sic], mill and business owners
 Marchwell, Saskatchewan — Frank M. and Charles H. March and Henry Wells, owners of March Brothers and Wells, a land holding and development company
 Marianna, Florida — Mary and Anna, daughters of town founder Scott Beveridge
 Marietta, Pennsylvania — Mary Cook and Etta Anderson, wives of the founders
 Marshan Township, Dakota County, Minnesota — Michael and Ann Marsh, early settlers
 Martwick, Kentucky — Charles A. Martin and Judge William A. Wickliffe, mine owners
 Marwayne, Alberta — S. C. Marfleet, first postmaster, and Wainfleet, Lincolnshire, England, his original home
 Mary Esther, Florida — daughters of the first postmaster, John Newton
 Maunie, Illinois — Maude Sheridan and Jennie Pumphrey, daughters of early settlers
 Maxstone, Saskatchewan — Alexander Maxwell and Stonehenge, a nearby district
 Meleb, Manitoba — Melnyk, farmer, and Lebman, storekeeper
 Micola, Missouri — Michie and Coleman, founders
 Milden, Saskatchewan — Charles Mills and Robert Bryden, early settlers
 Milfay, Oklahoma — Charles Mills and Edward Fay, railroad officials
 Mindale, Illinois (Schuyler County) — Minnie and Dale Gallaher, general store owners
 Minneola, Kansas — Minnie Davis and Ola Watson, early settlers
 Moronts, Illinois — Moore and Chonts, railroad construction workers
 Naicam, Saskatchewan — Naismith and Cameron, railway construction contractors
 Napfor, Kentucky — Napier, local family name, and Foreman, coal company official
 Nelscott, Oregon — Charles P. Nelson and Dr W. G. Scott, town founders (now part of Lincoln City, Oregon)
 Nicoma Park, Oklahoma — Dr G. A. Nichols, town founder, and Oklahoma
 Noralee, British Columbia — Nora and Lee Newgaard
 Nucrag, Idaho — rail siding and spur on the Camas Prairie Railroad, named for two rail workers: Newton, a conductor, and Craig, an engineer
 Olaton, Kentucky — Ola Wilson and her uncle Joel Payton, the postmaster
 Palco, Kansas — Palmer and Cole, railroad officials
 Palmdale, Minnesota — Frank Palmquist and Ogda Emilia Elmdahl, husband and wife
 Paragould, Arkansas — J. W. Paramore and Jay Gould, railroad owners
 Raljon, Maryland — former name of town where FedExField is located, for Ralph and John, sons of former Washington Redskins owner Jack Kent Cooke
 Raymore, Missouri — George Rae and H. C. Moore, town founders
 Raywick, Kentucky — Ray and Wickliffe, pioneer family names
 Roseglen, North Dakota — "rose" and Glennon, first settlers
 Roselawn, Indiana (originally Rose Lon) — Orlando Rose and Lon Craig, early merchants
 Rosiclare, Illinois — Rose and Clare, daughters of an early settler who were drowned in a boating accident
 Rush Hill, Missouri — town founders: Reusch and Hill
 Ruthilda, Saskatchewan — Ruth and Hilda, daughters of early settler H. Alex Goodwin
 Saidora, Illinois — Sadie and Dora, pioneer women
 Sarona, Wisconsin — combination of Sauer (early settler) plus Sharon plain in Israel
 Scotford, Alberta — Thomas Walter Scott, first premier of Saskatchewan, and Alexander Cameron Rutherford, first premier of Alberta
 Shawswick Township, Lawrence County, Indiana — William Shaw, war hero, and Judge William W. Wick, eminent jurist
 Sherridon, Manitoba — Carl Sherritt and J. Peter Gordon, founders of Sherritt Gordon Mines, Ltd., now Sherritt International Corporation
 Snowflake, Arizona — Erastus Snow and William Jordan Flake, Mormon bishops
 Stronghurst, Illinois — William B. Strong and R. D. Hurst, president and vice president, respectively, of the Santa Fe Railroad
 Valmeyer, Illinois — "valley" and Meyer, local family name
 Veda Lake — lake in the Oregon Cascades, first stocked by Vern Rogers and Dave Donaldson, who the lake was named after
 Vidora, Saskatchewan — Vivian and Dorothy, wife and daughter of J. M. MacArthur, CPR railway official
 WaKeeney, Kansas — Albert Warren and James F. Keeney, real estate developers
 Wallard, Saskatchewan — Charles H. Waller and George Washington Card, first postmaster and first settler, respectively
 Walbert, Missouri — sons of early postmaster: Walter and Herbert Baur
 Wardell, Missouri — R. L. Warren + "dell"
 Wayan, Idaho — Wayne and Ann Nevils, early settlers
 Westlock, Alberta — William Westgate and William Lockhart
 Wilark, Oregon — Wilson and Clark, two families of lumbermen who owned the Clark and Wilson Lumber Company
 Wilfred, Indiana — Wilford and Fredman, coal mining operators
 Wilmont Township, Nobles County, Minnesota — compromise name between Willumet and Lamont (significance of those names unknown)
 Woodmohr, Wisconsin — Woodard, an assemblyman and Lawrence Mohr, early settler
 Zenoria, Louisiana — Zed and Noria, husband and wife, early settlers

Livestock
 Bimble, Kentucky — Bim and Bill, two oxen owned by Will Payne, first postmaster
 Clemretta, British Columbia — Clementine and Henrietta, two cows owned by the first postmaster

Other portmanteaus
 Acmar, Alabama — Acton and Margaret, two other Alabama towns with mines owned by the same company
 Algoma (various places with this name, such as Algoma District, Ontario) — Algonquian and goma, derived from -gamaa (Algonquian: "lake"); coined by Henry Rowe Schoolcraft
 Alkabo, North Dakota — "alkali" and "gumbo", two types of soil in the area
 Aquadeo, Saskatchewan — "aquatics" and "rodeo"
 Arenac County, Michigan — arena (Latin: "sand") and auke (Algonquian: "place"); coined by Henry Rowe Schoolcraft
 Arrowbear Lake, California, a small community halfway between Lake Arrowhead and Big Bear Lake in the San Bernardino mountains.
 Ashton, Maryland — Ashland and Clifton, two nearby estates
 Bellevyria, North Dakota — Bellevue, Ohio and Elyria, Ohio, original homes of two early settlers
 Belmopan, Belize — Belize River and the Mopan River
 Bethalto, Illinois — Bethel, original name of the town, and Alton, nearby town
 Borosolvay, California — Pacific Coast Borax Company and the Solvay Process Company
 BosWash or BosNYWash, terms occasionally used for the chain of interlocking coastal metropolitan areas (stretching from Boston in the north to Washington, D.C. in the south) that make up the Northeast megalopolis.
 Bralorne, British Columbia — Bralco and Lorne (name of the mine); Bralco is a company name coined by combining BRitish, ALberta, and COlumbia
 Calistoga, California — California and Saratoga 
 Canoat, Saskatchewan — Canadian oats
 Canwood, Saskatchewan — Canadian woodlands
 Carcross, Yukon — Caribou Crossing
 Carlea, Saskatchewan — Carrot and Leather Rivers flow together near the town
 Carway, Alberta — Cardston and "highway"
 Centrahoma, Oklahoma — central Oklahoma
 Clearco, West Virginia — Clear Creek Coal Company
 Colora, Maryland — culmen and aura (Latin: "ridge", "breeze")
 Crekola, Oklahoma — Creek (tribe) and Oklahoma
 Dacoma, Oklahoma — Dakota (tribe) and Oklahoma
 Dakem, North Dakota — North Dakota and Emmons County
 Delanco, New Jersey — Delaware River and Rancocas Creek
 Delanson, New York — Delaware and Hudson
 Delawanna station (New Jersey Transit stop in Clifton, New Jersey) — Delaware, Lackawanna and Western Railroad
 Donavon, Saskatchewan — Don River (Ontario) and Avon River (Ontario)
 Echola, Alabama — "echo" and Alabama
 Enehoe, Oklahoma — last letters of Cheyenne and Arapaho
 Flagami, Miami, Florida — neighbourhood around Flagler Street and Tamiami Canal
 Gascozark, Missouri — Gasconade River and Ozarks
 Glentana, Montana — "glen" and Montana
 Golburn, Saskatchewan — "goldenrod" and "burning"
 Granisle, British Columbia — Granby Mining Company and "isle", for McDonald Island where its mine was located
 Haybro, Colorado — Hayden brothers, coal operators
 Idahome, Idaho — Idaho and "home"
 Indiahoma, Oklahoma — Indian and Oklahoma, a portmanteau which most likely honors the area's Native-American roots
 Indialantic, Florida — between the Indian River (Florida) and the Atlantic Ocean
 Indrio, Florida — Indian River (Florida) and rio (Spanish: "river")
 Irrigon, Oregon — "irrigation" and Oregon
 Lake Itasca, Minnesota — veritas and caput (Latin: "truth", "head"); coined by Henry Rowe Schoolcraft
 Kanwaka, Kansas — Kansas and Wakarusa Rivers
 Lempom, California — "lemon" and "pomegranate"
 Linwood, Michigan — "line" and "wood"
 Lorwood, Missouri — Lorain County, Ohio and Wood County, Ohio, original homes of three mill owners
 Marfrance, West Virginia — Margaret and Frances, two coal mining companies
 Millux, California — Miller & Lux, stock-raising firm
 Miloma, Minnesota — two railroads: the Milwaukee Road (Chicago, Milwaukee, St. Paul and Pacific Railroad), and the Omaha Road (Chicago, St. Paul, Minneapolis & Omaha Railway)
 Lake Mohawksin, Wisconsin — last syllables of the three rivers that flow into the lake: the Somo, the Tomahawk and the Wisconsin
 Oaknolia, Louisiana — "oak" and "magnolia", trees growing in the area
 Okeelanta, Florida — Lake Okeechobee and Atlantic Ocean
 Okeene, Oklahoma — the last syllables of Cherokee and Cheyenne
 Oklaunion, Texas — Oklahoma and "union"
 Orlovista, Florida — Orlando and vista (Spanish: "view")
 Orovada, Nevada — oro (Spanish: "gold") and Nevada
 Oscoda County, Michigan — ossin and muscoda (Algonquian: "pebble", "prairie"); coined by Henry Rowe Schoolcraft
 Palwaukee Municipal Airport — Palatine Road and Milwaukee Avenue in Cook County, Illinois; now renamed Chicago Executive Airport
 Penndel, Pennsylvania — named after the Pennsylvania/Delaware Highway
 Penn Yan, New York — Pennsylvania and Yankee
 Riverhurst, Saskatchewan — Riverside and Boldenhurst, two nearby post offices
 Rondowa, Oregon — from Grande Ronde River and Wallowa River
 Salvisa, Kentucky — located between Salt River and Levisa River (former name of Kentucky River)
 Sanganois State Fish and Wildlife Area, Illinois — Sangamon River and Illinois
 Camp Saskadet — Saskatchewan and "cadet"; military campground for training of cadets, near Kelvington, Saskatchewan
 Solromar, California — sol, oro, and mar (Spanish: "sun", "gold", and "sea")
 Shewag Creek and Shewag Lake, Idaho — in between Sheep Creek and Wagonhammer Creek
 Tamiami, Florida — Tampa to Miami
 Transcona, Winnipeg, Manitoba — Transcontinental Railway and Strathcona (for Donald Smith, Lord Strathcona)
 Uravan, Colorado — "uranium" and "vanadium"
 Valsetz, Oregon — Valley and Siletz Railroad
 Vansterdam — Vancouver and Amsterdam
 Walland, Tennessee — Walton and England, from the Walton and England Leather Co. which established a tannery there.
 Weskan, Kansas — western Kansas
 Winnitoba railway station, Manitoba — Winnipeg and Manitoba
 Woolaroc — museum and game preserve in Oklahoma; name is a blend of "woods" "lakes" and "rocks"

See also
 List of portmanteaus
 List of geographic acronyms and initialisms
 List of geographic anagrams and ananyms

References

portmanteau
portmanteau